Cryptoseius is a genus of mites in the family Eviphididae. There are at least two described species in Cryptoseius, C. khayyami and C. petrovae.

References

Acari genera
Mesostigmata
Articles created by Qbugbot